This is a list of notable CJK fonts (computer fonts which contain a large range of Chinese/Japanese/Korean characters). These fonts are primarily sorted by their typeface, the main classes being "with serif", "without serif" and "script". In this article, the two first classes are named Ming and sans-serif (gothic) while the "script" is further divided into several Chinese script styles.

The fonts are then sorted by their target writing system:
 Chinese: Chinese character.This can be subdivided into the following classification:
 Simplified Chinese
 Traditional Chinese (General, using printing standard or jiu zixing)
 Traditional Chinese (Taiwan, using education standard: Standard Form of National Characters)
 Traditional Chinese (Hong Kong, using education standard: List of Graphemes of Commonly-Used Chinese Characters)
 Simplified Chinese will be shortened to SC and Traditional Chinese will be shortened to TC in the following localization table.
 Japanese: kanji, hiragana and katakana
 Korean: Hangul, hanja, etc.
 Vietnamese: for the Nom script formerly used
 Zhuang: for Sawndip
 Pan-Unicode: intended to globally support the majority of Unicode's characters, and not specifically designed for one or a few writing systems (note that Pan-Unicode font ≠ Unicode font)
 Pan-CJK: intended to support the majority of Chinese/Japanese/Korean characters, and not specifically designed for any one of these writing systems

Legends 
[F] means this font is free and open-source software (FOSS). [F] means it was formerly seen as FOSS but has been involved in a legal controversy.

Ming (Song)

Pan-Unicode/Pan-CJK

Chinese

Japanese

Korean

Vietnamese

Zhuang

Sans-serif

Pan-Unicode/Pan-CJK

Chinese

Japanese

Korean

Vietnamese

Regular script

Chinese

Vietnamese

Clerical script

Imitation Song

Other fonts or projects

Pan-Unicode/Pan-CJK

Chinese

Japanese

Korean

Font series 
This section lists fonts that are designed to be used together, or created by the same person/organization such that it forms a series of fonts.

Font Foundries 
This section lists major font foundries that produce CJK fonts.

See also
 Calligraphy
 Chinese input methods for computers
 Free software Unicode typefaces
 Japanese input methods
 Keyboard layout
 Korean language and computers
 List of typefaces
 Unicode typeface

Notes

References

Further reading

External links

 
 
 East Asian Unicode fonts for Windows computers
 List of free Simplified Chinese fonts
 List of free Traditional Chinese fonts
 List of free Japanese fonts
 List of free Korean fonts
 Free Chinese Font
 Free Japanese Font
 Free Korean Fonts
 Arphic Public License: a free font, licensed by Arphic Technology
  免费中文字体
  適用於 GNU/Linux 的字型
 Japanese Fonts on OSDN
 CJKV Fonts on ArchWiki
 Maoken.com, Free Chinese Fonts list
 Luc Devroye's Type Design Information Pages: China, Hong Kong, Japan, Korea, Macau, Taiwan

Chinese script style
Chinese type styles